Belden Namah (born 30 December 1969) is a Papua New Guinea politician. He is a Member of the National Parliament of Papua New Guinea for the Papua New Guinea Party, representing Vanimo-Green since 2007. He served in Cabinet from 2007 to 2010 and as Deputy Prime Minister from 2011 to 2012. From 2012, he was an important member of the Parliamentary opposition. After retaining his seat in the 2022 election, he rejoined the government benches.

Military career 
Namah originates from Vanimo near the border of Indonesia. He joined the military and graduated from Australia's Royal Military College Duntroon. He received training for a Special Forces Unit (SFU). During the Sandline affair he played a major role as one of the five PNG Defence Force officers who kidnapped Tim Spicer, the leader of Sandline's personnel. Sandline had been hired by the PNG government to recapture the Panguna mine on Bougainville island and quell the insurrection there. The SFU, under the direction of subsequently disgraced PNGDF commander, Jerry Singirok, withdrew their collaboration with the Sandline contractors in what was effectively a mutiny, thus terminating the intended intervention. Namah and his companions were afterwards sentenced to six years imprisonment for mutiny despite party-political support vindicating Namah and the SFU. Namah was paroled in 2003 and pardoned in 2005. Julius Chan was Prime Minister at the time and declared in his memoirs in 2018 to have no regrets of his handling of the affair.

Parliamentary career 
In 2007, he entered Parliament as a member of the National Alliance Party and became minister of Forestry and Natural Resources in the Somare-Temu cabinet. In 2010, he resigned from the Cabinet and joined Mekere Morauta and the Papua New Guinea Party. Namah became a major participant in opposition leading to the overthrow of the Somare government. Namah subsequently became Deputy Prime Minister and Minister of Forestry and National Resources in the O'Neill-Namah cabinet during the PNG Constitutional Crisis from 2011 to 2012. Namah retained his seat in 2012, 2017 and 2022 elections. He lost his Cabinet post after the 2012 election, becoming Opposition Leader from 2012 to 2014.

After he was deposed as Leader of the Opposition in 2014, he tried to become Governor of his home province, Sandaun Province. This post was vacant because the election of Amkat Mai was nullified and could be filled by another MP in the province. Namah was proclaimed to be the interim Governor and mobilised support among local politicians, which was challenged by the provincial administration. The dispute revolved through a by-election for Governor in April 2015, which Namah later withdrew from. Amkat Mai's appeal against disqualification was successful and he was returned as Governor. In April 2018, Namah was dismissed from office by the Leadership Tribunal. Namah was soon readmitted as a Member of Parliament in July 2018. In the meantime, Namah appealed to the National Court against the decision of the Leadership Tribunal. The National Court confirmed to stay his expulsion as long as his appeal against the decision of the Leadership tribunal was under consideration.

Namah became de facto leader of the opposition where he fronted two initiatives to seize power. First, he challenged the succession of O'Neill by James Marape in court, which he lost. Secondly, he led a campaign to mount a vote of no confidence to replace Marape with Patrick Pruaitch. This attempt failed after the opposition camp split between Pruaitch and Sam Basil. The supporters of Sam Basil returned to government alongside Pruaitch, but Namath remained in the opposition. Namah proceeded again with an attempt to mount a vote of no confidence and backed Peter O'Neill as Prime Minister. In 2022, Namah announced he would leave the opposition and join the government benches. He was appointed in September 2022 as Chairman of the Foreign Affairs and Defence Parliament Committee.

Namah and the courts
In 2015, there were sixteen cases of misconduct brought against Namah by the Ombudsman' commission. In May 2012, Namah stormed into the Supreme Court while Chief Justice Salomo Injia was in session. He demanded Injia's immediate resignation on the charge of sedition. This event occurred because the Supreme Court upheld the judicial decision from December 2011 to consider the O'Neill-Namah government illegal. The matter was referred to the Ombudsman Commission as a case of misconduct in office. Namah apologised soon after the event to former Prime Minister Michael Somare as well as to former Chief Justice Salamo Injia for his behaviour during the 2011-2012 parliamentary crisis. The Ombudsman decided on a leadership tribunal despite Namah's behaviour. The proceedings experienced a number of postponements.

Namah was referred by the Prosecutor to a Leadership tribunal in October 2016, four and a half years after the events took place. He was then automatically suspended from his post. The tribunal reached a decision after a further two years in April 2018 and recommended that he be dismissed from office. Namah asked for a judicial review to stay his dismissal and to object to the ruling on the grounds of miscarriage of justice. Several reasons for this were mentioned including that several MPs were involved in the storming of the Supreme Court and Namah was the only one prosecuted. Namah admitted again that he made an error of judgement on his part and regretted his decision to storm the Court.  It took another two years until 2020 to come to the decision to stay the decision of the leadership tribunal. The National Court granted in June 2020 a stay against most of the charges against Namah. However, the Public Prosecutor appealed to the Supreme Court and asked for the continuation of a temporary suspension until the cases were decided.

The Supreme Court found in September 2020 in Namah's favour. Namah on his side had asked for reinstatement to the full range of privileges and positions open to him after the quashing of the Leadership Tribunal decision. Namah acted as de facto Leader of the Opposition after being readmitted to Parliament. This was questioned in early 2020 by the then-acting Attorney-General. He argued that Namah had no standing as Opposition Leader in a court case challenging the appointment of Marape as Prime Minister because Patrick Pruaitch was still Opposition Leader at the time of filing the complaint. Patrick Pruaitch had then not yet rejoined the government. The Supreme Court agreed with that argument and dismissed Namah's attempt to question the appointment of Marape.

Namah's challenges were again revived in November 2020 when Prime Minister James Marape opened a civil case on the storming of the Parliament instead of a Leadership case. At that time, Namah was leading an attempt to unseat Marape. Marape motivated his move with the argument that a conviction of Namah should be a deterrent to others. The Speaker of Parliament had before that already recognised Namah as Opposition Leader.

Issues of integrity

The number of complaints to the Ombudsman commission may indicate controversy. Namah portrays himself as a successful businessman which is queried by political opponents. After Namah lost the post of Deputy Prime Minister after the 2012 elections, he tabled an accusation in Parliament against Prime Minister Peter O'Neill. He had allowed the transfer of A$30 million to PNG law firm Paul Park lawyers. Namah approached the police directly on this issue as O'Neill was in his opinion disqualified as acting Minister of Police. O'Neill in his turn asked the Ombudsman commission to inquire into how Namah obtained 50 million kinas to spend in his campaign as Namah was not a successful businessman.

A disciplinary issue in an Australian casino revealed that Namah was ejected from a casino in Sydney because of misbehaviour but was readmitted immediately as a so-called high roller. Three punters, one of which was Belden Namah had deposited A$800,000. The source of his wealth is logging and palm oil. Namah was accused of taking money from an export level development level trust fund (US$4.5 million) meant for the construction of the Pasir-Krisha road project in West Sepik. Namah insisted that the money was properly spent on sealing 12 kilometres of road for development within the timber project area`.

Minister of Forestry and Natural Resources 
Namah was Minister of Forestry and Natural Resources when the possibility for Special Agricultural Business Licenses (SABL) was legislated, which offers light regulation if a community makes an agreement with the logger. In this case, the logger is expected to return money to the community with the intention to enable sustainable economic activity in the area. SABL is meant to facilitate logging concessions and use the proceeds to stimulate economic and social development that will last after the concession is exhausted. There are widespread accusations that these licenses are window-dressing for parasitic logging operations. Such accusations have also been made against the Bewani SABL. The National newspaper, which is owned by Malaysian logging company Rimbunan Hijau, published an article claiming that the project was not in control of landowners but was owned by Bewani Oil Palm Plantation Limited (BOPPL). The paper had to retract accusations that BOPPL had not invested in projects benefiting the communities and that the majority of landowners did not support the project. It also had to withdraw the accusation that the projects were mostly about logging. The area had been logged before and is covered with secondary vegetation. It also had to retract any doubt on the legality of the project beyond saying that certain matters are before the courts.

Production started in 2018 but faced issues in 2020 when Indonesian workers did not turn up due to the COVID-19 Pandemic. National workers were therefore less important than claimed before. Namah portrays Bewani SBL and POPPL as independent from him, but he presented himself then as part of the management of POPPL. Namah is frequently associated with Malaysian business interests. Malaysian logging interests also appeared in a story about the interception of the government's Falcon jet by Indonesian fighter jets. The PNG government plane was on a journey from Sabah to Port Moresby and had onboard not only Belden Namah and other PNG politicians but also Malaysian loggers and US$250 million in cash.

Personal politics 
When Namah became Deputy Prime Minister in 2011 he declared that any government he might lead would aim to provide free universal education (noting that education was "a right guaranteed under the constitution"),  healthcare, and to "fix the law and order problem in this country". In that regard, discipline would be instilled by compelling prospective students to undergo a two-year military service before entering university. There would be support for Papua New Guinean scientists working on climate change. He also said he supported the Somare government's bill on introducing reserved seats for women in Parliament.

During his time in opposition, he increasingly promoted himself as a pro-business candidate. In the run up to the 2022 election he advocated for the privatisation of state enterprises. Instead of government involvement in resource projects, he wanted landowners and local businesses to be involved. He proposed a massive agricultural expansion through plantation agriculture and extensive outgrowing schemes for small farmers. He claimed that the PNG economy was import-driven and that he wanted to turn that around to an export-driven economy.

Personal life 
Belden Namah is a Seventh Day Adventist. He is married with children. He enjoys sports, especially rugby league.

References

Members of the National Parliament of Papua New Guinea
Government ministers of Papua New Guinea
Papua New Guinea Party politicians
Papua New Guinean military personnel
Living people
Deputy Prime Ministers of Papua New Guinea
1968 births